Bartow Regional Medical Center is a hospital in Bartow, Florida. It is owned by non-profit health care provider BayCare. Bartow Regional Medical Center's main building is a general use hospital that includes an emergency department, an intensive care unit and various outpatient services. On the south side of Osprey Boulevard, which is south of the main building, are two medical office buildings. These buildings house physician offices and clinics, including the hospital's sleep disorders center.

History
In 1925 Bartow Memorial Hospital was opened and at that time was managed by the City of Bartow. The hospital, located on East Main Street, grew to include a number of buildings. In 1954 Bartow Memorial became a non-profit organization. In 1996 the hospital became part of the Columbia-HCA Healthcare System. Columbia changed its name to the Hospital Corporation of America and held Bartow Memorial until 1999. In September 1998 construction began on the current hospital, located on the north side of Bartow.

While construction was underway, LifePoint Hospitals Incorporated became the new owner of Bartow Memorial. Construction was completed in December 1999 and the new hospital building had . The hospital was renamed as Bartow Regional Medical Center. Later, Health Management Associates (HMA) bought the hospital. In January 2014, HMA was bought by Community Health Systems. In 2015, the hospital was sold to Clearwater-based BayCare Health System, a non-profit organization.

Ratings
The HealthGrades website provides rating data for Bartow Regional Medical Center. Of the thirteen patient safety indicators listed, Bartow Regional scored one below average, two average and two better than average. Patient survey data on the HealthGrades website says 55% of patients gave the hospital a 9 or 10. Nationally, 69% of patients gave hospitals a 9 or 10. HealthGrades provided data on rated patient outcomes in eighteen specialties. Outcomes for these specialties while patients were still in the hospital were rated. Fifteen of these specialties were rated as average (3 stars). None was rated as worse (1 star) and three were rated better than average (5 stars). This rating scheme only allows three options to be recorded, 1, 3 or 5 stars; there are no options of giving 2 or 4 stars.

References

Hospital buildings completed in 1925
Buildings and structures in Bartow, Florida
Hospitals in Florida
1925 establishments in Florida